Nay Aru (or Nai Aru) is a river in Northern Province, Sri Lanka. The river rises in south-west Vavuniya District, before flowing north/north-west through Vavuniya District and Mannar District. The river empties into Palk Bay.

See also 
 List of rivers in Sri Lanka

References 

Rivers of Sri Lanka
Bodies of water of Mannar District
Bodies of water of Vavuniya District